Kingsmead may refer to:

Places in England 
 Kingsmead, Bath, an electoral ward in Somerset
 Kingsmead Square, Bath
 Kingsmead, Cheshire
 Kingsmead, a district of Shenley Brook End in Milton Keynes, Buckinghamshire

Other uses 
 Kingsmead College, a private girls' elementary and high school in Melrose, Johannesburg, South Africa
 Kingsmead Cricket Ground, Durban, South Africa
 Kingsmead Marsh, a nature reserve in Staffordshire, England
 Kingsmead School (disambiguation)
 Kingsmead Stadium, former venue in Canterbury, England
 Kingsmead Viaduct, A10 road, Ware, England
 King's Mead Priory, Derby, England

See also 
 King's Meads, nature reserve in Hertfordshire, England